Moulin Rouge (named after the French cabaret) is a Slovenian popular music group consisting of vocalist Alenka Šmid-Čena and songwriter, keyboardist, and producer Matjaž Kosi.

Profile

Keyboardist Matjaž Kosi founded Moulin Rouge after leaving Slovenian (then Yugoslav) synthpop band Videosex in 1985.  Initially, Moulin Rouge consisted of three men; after reorganizing, Matjaž Kosi held an audition for a female vocalist.  Alenka Šmid-Čena was chosen as lead vocalist.  The band took its 1980s membership of Matjaž Kosi and Alenka Šmid-Čena in 1987.  They were active primarily from the late 1980s to the early 2000s, and their work combines elements of 1980s Eurodance, Italo disco, Hi-NRG, and trance.  Moulin Rouge entered Jugovizija, the Yugoslav national pre-selection for the Eurovision Song Contest, in 1987 with the song "Bye bye baby," finishing in sixth place, and returned a year later with the song "Johnny je moj," finishing in fourth place.  In 2000  Matjaž Kosi released a truly solo album (2010 - title inspired by the sequel of the Stanley Kubrick movie 2001: A Space Odyssey meaning long absence from the music scene). He wrote, played, produced and sang all the vocal parts. The album was for Slovenia only; no English version has been done so far. After working with many other artists, he met Karmen Plazar, a young female singer with a solo album already released.  Kosi made a cover version of Moulin Rouge's classic hit Prvi tvoj poljub (Your First Kiss), where she was introduced as Lady C.  After promising feedback from listeners, Kosi invited her to join Moulin Rouge as a vocalist in 2002. The result was the album The Best Of 2002, a remake album of Moulin Rouge's 1980s hits. After that, they returned to international audiences with the single Just A Start, which received very good reviews, but due to lack of promotion and distribution, its success was moderate. The follow up was My Heart Is Beating Boom, which went viral after the introduction of YouTube. It was widely accepted by Japanese anime fans, who made their own video versions based on anime clips.

Moulin Rouge has enjoyed notable success among fans of electronic dance music in Germany, Scandinavia, United States, Italy, and particularly Japan.  Internationally, their best known singles include "High Energy Boy" (1987) and "Boys Don't Cry" (1988).  The latter was covered in a Japanese-language version entitled Namida o Misenaide (Boys Don't Cry) by Japanese female pop duo Wink in 1989.  The cover, with lyrics by songwriter Neko Oikawa, reached #1 on the Oricon weekly single chart.

In 2016, the band posted new photos on their Facebook page announcing their revival, with Matjaž Kosi as producer and Karmen Plazar appearing as vocalist.

Discography in Slovenia

International discography

References

This article incorporates material from the corresponding article in the Slovenian Wikipedia.

External links
 Discogs

Slovenian musical groups
Yugoslav musical groups
Musical groups established in 1985
Hi-NRG groups
Electronic music duos
1985 establishments in Yugoslavia